Nikolai Makarov (born December 19, 1948 in Cheliabinsk, Russia) is a retired ice hockey player who played in the Soviet Hockey League.  He played for Traktor Chelyabinsk. He is the elder brother of the Soviet (and NHL) hockey legend Sergei Makarov.

Playing career

Career in Soviet Union
Nikolai Makarov was a top Defenceman for Traktor Chelyabinsk during his time there. Makarov played in Soviet League from 1969 to 1982 as he had a 17-year career in Soviet top leagues.

Makarov also was part of the feared Soviet National Ice hockey Team in 1981 Ice Hockey World Championships.

Career in Finland
In 1982 Makarov was bought by SM-liiga team Jokerit. Makarov became a premier defenceman for Jokerit and was selected the best defenceman of the year in 1983. At the end of the regular season 1982–82, an opponent slashed his arm with his stick, causing a major injury, and Makarov was not able to recover fully before the play-off finals against IFK Helsinki, which Jokerit lost 3–2. One might speculate if Jokerit would have fared better in the finals, had Makarov been healthy throughout the series. The following year Makarov still played for Jokerit, but his play was visibly less energetic. At the end of his two years with Jokerit he retired from active playing in 1984.

Nikolai Makarov was inducted into the Russian and Soviet Hockey Hall of Fame in 1981.

Career statistics

Regular season and playoffs

Soviet totals do not include numbers from the 1969–70 season.

International

External links

 Russian and Soviet Hockey Hall of Fame bio

1948 births
Jokerit players
Living people
Soviet ice hockey defencemen
Traktor Chelyabinsk players